Merbabies is a Silly Symphonies animated Disney short film. It was released on December 9, 1938. It is a collaboration between Walt Disney and Harman and Ising, the latter studio having donated artists to Disney to work on the production of Snow White and the Seven Dwarfs (1937). It is one of the last shorts of the Silly Symphonies series.

Plot 

A large number of identical redheaded "merbabies" materialize out of the crashing surf and are summoned to a playground on the ocean floor for an underwater circus in which marine creatures such as seahorses and starfish also take part, beginning with a parade. When a whale blows all the merbabies to the surface inside bubbles, they disappear into the waves from which they came.

Notes 
 This is the only Disney short to be outsourced to the Harman-Ising Studio.

Home media 
The short was released on the DVD of The Little Mermaid II: Return to the Sea and again on December 19, 2006, on Walt Disney Treasures: More Silly Symphonies, Volume Two.

References

External links 
 
 

1938 films
1938 short films
1938 animated films
1930s fantasy comedy films
1938 musical comedy films
1930s Disney animated short films
Silly Symphonies
Animated films without speech
Animated musical films
Fictional mermen and mermaids
Films directed by Rudolf Ising
Films scored by Scott Bradley
American musical comedy films
1930s American films